Nicholas Colohan (1806 – 11 February 1890) was an Irish doctor and professor of medicine at Queen's University, Galway from 1849 to 1879.

Colohan was a native of Ballinasloe and related to William and James Colohan, highly respected doctors who practised in that town. 

He graduated with a medical degree from the University of Edinburgh in 1828, though without a surgical qualification. Colohan was one of six doctors associated with Galway's Fever Hospital.

He married Sara, daughter of Dr. Thomas Whistler of Oranmore. Their children included: John Colohan, Frances, William and Nicholas, who was the father of Arthur Colohan (1884–1952).

References
 The Colahans - A Remarkable Galway Family, Diarmuid Ó Cearbhaill, Journal of the Galway Archaeological and Historical Society, volume 54, 2002, pp. 121–140.

1806 births
1890 deaths
19th-century Irish medical doctors
Alumni of the University of Edinburgh
People associated with the University of Galway
People from County Galway